Helen Ivory (born 1969) is an English poet, artist, tutor, and editor.

Career
Ivory is a poet and visual artist.  Her fifth Bloodaxe Books collection is The Anatomical Venus ( 2019), which centres on women and otherness. She has co-edited with George Szirtes In Their Own Words: Contemporary Poets on their Poetry Salt 2012. She edits the webzine Ink Sweat and Tears and is a lecturer for  UEA/ National Centre for Writing online creative writing.  In 2020 she became a Versopolis poet and has work translated into Ukrainian, Polish and Spanish. 

Fool’s World, a collaborative Tarot with the artist Tom de Freston (Gatehouse Press), won the 2016 Saboteur Best Collaborative Work award.  A collection of collage/mixed-media poems entitled Hear What the Moon Told Me was published in 2016 by Knives Forks and Spoons Press.

In early 2019, SurVison published a chapbook of predominantly surrealist poems titled Maps of the Abandoned City. Reviewing it in London Grip magazine, Rosie Jackson noted the rare skill Ivory has to make her surrealism float into a world where politics – particularly sexual politics – are still pertinent.

The Anatomical Venus won the East Anglian Writers 'By the Cover' Award at the East Anglian Book Awards.  Reviewing for Storgy, Rachael Smart writes: "This collection is a stunningly curated linguistic exhibition on the historical abuse of women. Enticing and yet flinching, this disquieting house of dolls makes abuse seen and urges us to revaluate  why women are where they are now, and it does so with an eerie and unforgettable beauty."

In 2019, Ivory was named as one of the EDP's 100 Most Inspiring Women.

Awards
In 1999, Ivory won an Eric Gregory Award from the Society of Authors.

Personal life
Ivory was born in Luton but has lived in Norwich since 1990.  She is married to the poet and photographer Martin Figura.

Works

Poetry collections 
 The Double Life of Clocks (Bloodaxe Books, 2002)
 The Dog in the Sky (Bloodaxe Books, 2006)
 The Breakfast Machine (Bloodaxe Books, 2010)
 Waiting for Bluebeard (Bloodaxe Books, 2013)
 Hear What the Moon Told Me(Knives Forks and Spoons Press, 2015)
Maps of the Abandoned City (SurVision Press)   (2019)
The Anatomical Venus (Bloodaxe Books, 2019)

Collaborations 
 Fool's World, with Tom de Freston (Gatehouse Press, 2015)

As editor
 In Their Own Words: Contemporary Poets on Their Poetry, co-edited with George Szirtes (Salt Publishing, 2012)

References

External links
Official website
Helen Ivory at Bloodaxe Books
 https://www.edp24.co.uk/features/100-most-inspiring-women-in-norfolk-1-6294621
 https://storgy.com/2020/01/21/the-anatomical-venus-by-helen-ivory/

1969 births
Living people
Academics of the University of East Anglia
English women poets
Surrealist poets